The 2007 CONCACAF and CONMEBOL Beach Soccer championship also known as the 2007 FIFA Beach Soccer World Cup qualifiers for CONCACAF and CONMEBOL a beach soccer championship for nations of the Americas, held in August 2007, in Acapulco, Mexico, to determine the best countries' national teams in the region and hence which nations would progress to the World Cup later that year.

The United States won the championship, beating Uruguay in the final, whilst Argentina beat Mexico in the third place play off to finish third and fourth respectively. These nations moved on to play in the 2007 FIFA Beach Soccer World Cup in Rio de Janeiro, Brazil from November 2 - November 11.

The two groups were originally staged as two separate championships for each of the confederations; the winners of those groups were deemed to of won their respective confederation titles. Concluding the event were a set of friendly matches between the respective winners, runners-up etc. of each championship, to unofficially rank the teams collectively from 1st through 6th place.

However, since 2010, CONCACAF who organised the event has retrospectively amended history to now refer to the event as one single joint championship between CONMEBOL and CONCACAF nations. Following the group stage, the concluding friendly matches are now deemed to have been the final stage of the tournament, officially determining final placements and podium finishes of the combined nations of both confederations in one set of final standings.

Participating nations
North, Central American and Caribbean zone:

South American zone:

Note: Brazil did not play in the championship as they qualified to the 2007 World Cup as hosts.

Group stage
CONCACAF and CONMEBOL were split up into two separate groups, before playing each other in the play off stage.

CONCACAF Group (North, Central American and Caribbean zone)

CONMEBOL Group (South America)

Play off stage

Fifth place play off

Third place play off

Final

Winners

Final standings

References

FIFA Beach Soccer World Cup qualification (CONCACAF)
FIFA Beach Soccer World Cup qualification (CONMEBOL)
Beach
International association football competitions hosted by Mexico
Beach
Beach
Beach
2007 in beach soccer